Bhaskar Rao Bollineni is an Indian entrepreneur and cardiothoracic surgeon who founded the chain of KIMS Hospitals in Andhra Pradesh and Telangana.

Background
Bhaskar Rao Bollineni completed his medical education from Rangaraya Medical College, Kakinada, and Masters from Madras Medical College, Chennai. After practicing in Medwin Hospitals and Mahavir Trust Hospital, he established the KIMS Group of hospitals with a first hospital in Nellore. Currently, the chain has 12 hospitals across Andhra Pradesh and Telangana.

As a surgeon he has performed over 30,000 surgeries. Bhaskar Rao was also an important part of the Rajiv Gandhi Aarogyasri Scheme, launched in 2007 in combined Andhra Pradesh for providing health care to the economically weaker sections. He was shortlisted as a finalist at EY Entrepreneur of the Year Award 2019. Bhaskar Rao is married to Rajyasree, daughter of former Chief Minister of Andhra Pradesh, Bhavanam Venkatarami Reddy, and has two sons, both of them are associated with the KIMS Group of Hospitals.

Awards
2019   Finalist, EY Entrepreneur of the Year Award
2017   Times Healthcare Achievers Award
2017   Times Healthcare Lifetime Achievers Award

References

Indian cardiologists
Living people
Telugu people
Businesspeople from Andhra Pradesh
20th-century Indian medical doctors
20th-century Indian businesspeople
Indian businesspeople in the healthcare industry
Year of birth missing (living people)